Masurian or Mazurian may refer to:
someone or something from Masuria
the Masurians, a sub-ethnic group
the Masurian dialect of Polish
the Masurians, historical name for Masovians
Warmian-Masurian Voivodeship, an administrative division in northern Poland
Masurian Landscape Park, a protected area in Masuria
Masurian Lake District